The Day Reagan Was Shot is a 2001 American made-for-television film drama film directed by Cyrus Nowrasteh and co-produced by Oliver Stone. The film stars Richard Dreyfuss as Alexander Haig and Richard Crenna as Ronald Reagan, and co-stars Michael Murphy, Holland Taylor, Kenneth Welsh and Colm Feore.

Plot
The film is loosely based on events surrounding the Reagan assassination attempt on March 30, 1981 by John Hinckley Jr., and depicts a media frenzy, a divided White House cabinet and staff with little control, and a fictional threat of international crisis.

Cast

Richard Dreyfuss as Alexander Haig
Richard Crenna as Ronald Reagan
Colm Feore as Caspar Weinberger
Michael Murphy as Michael Deaver
Holland Taylor as Nancy Reagan
Kenneth Welsh as James Baker
Leon Pownall as Ed Meese
Robert Bockstael as Richard V. Allen
Beau Starr as Special Agent Cage
Alex Carter as Dr. Allard
Andrew Tarbet as Dr. Gregorio
Christian Lloyd as John Hinckley Jr.
Sean McCann as Donald Regan
Jack Jessop as William J. Casey
John Connolly as James Brady
Angela Gei as Sarah Brady
Michael Greene as George Bush
Yannick Bisson as Buddy Stein
Frank Moore as Lt. Col. Taylor
Ken James as Chairman of the Joint Chiefs of Staff, General Yates (Based on David C. Jones)
Oliver Dennis as David Gergen
Bernard Behrens as William F. Smith
Tiffanie Bell as Nurse Sally
Wayne Best as FBI Agent Kirkus
Christopher Bondy as White House Reporter
Brendan Connor as White House Reporter
Neil Crone as Lyn Nofziger
James Downing as Bagman
Dan Duran as Network Anchor
Greg Ellwand as Night Time News Host

Awards and nominations
American Cinema Editors
Won: Best Edited Motion Picture for Non-Commercial Television (Paul Seydor)

Satellite AwardsWon: Best Actor – Miniseries or Television Film (Richard Dreyfuss)Won: Best Television FilmScreen Actors Guild Award'''
Nominated: Outstanding Performance by a Male Actor in a Miniseries or Television Movie (Richard Dreyfuss)

External links

2001 television films
2001 films
2001 drama films
American drama films
Films about assassinations
Films about presidents of the United States
Films set in 1981
Films set in Washington, D.C.
Attempted assassination of Ronald Reagan
Showtime (TV network) films
Films directed by Cyrus Nowrasteh
2000s American films